San Tsuen or Lam Tsuen San Tsuen is a village in Lam Tsuen, Tai Po District, Hong Kong.

See also
 San Tong, a village adjecent to Lam Tsuen San Tsuen, located to its southwest

External links
 Delineation of area of existing village Sam Tsuen (Lam Tsuen) (Tai Po) for election of resident representative (2019 to 2022)

Villages in Tai Po District, Hong Kong
Lam Tsuen